Sheikh Anta Diop College is a private high school in Johannesburg, South Africa. It was established in 1994.

See also
Cheikh Anta Diop

Notes and references

External links 

Schools in Johannesburg
1994 establishments in South Africa
Educational institutions established in 1994